Wooddale High School is a high school in Memphis, Tennessee, United States. Wooddale is a part of Shelby County Schools. Their mascot is the Cardinal. The school is located at 5151 Scottsdale Avenue.

Notable alumni include former NFL defensive tackle Dontari Poe.

External links
 Wooddale High School

Public high schools in Tennessee
Schools in Memphis, Tennessee